Elite Model Look Chile is an annual fashion modeling event held by Elite Model Chile Management since 1997. The winner of the title takes it for one year, taking part later in Elite Model Look international contest. The first runner-up goes to Elite Model Look Latino. The selection of the delegates is realized in "scoutings" in different cities of Chile.

Titleholders

EML Chile for Elite Model Look International

EML Chile for Elite Model Look Latino

Notable past contestants
 Ana Luisa König
 Constanza Silva
 Bernardita Zúñiga
 Gabriela Fuentes
 Sofía Stitchkin
 Inna Moll
 Ignacia Walton
 Carolina de Moras
 Javiera Díaz de Valdés
 Lucy Cominetti
 Angela Prieto
 Josefina Montane
 Fernanda Figueroa
 Isidora de Solminihac
 Carolina Lopez Fortuño
 Tutu Vidaurre

References

External links
Elite Chile
Elite Model Look 27th World Final / Shanghai, China

Modeling competitions
Fashion events in Chile
Recurring events established in 1997
1997 establishments in Chile
Chilean awards